National Folk Museum of Korea is a national museum of South Korea, located within the grounds of the Gyeongbokgung Palace in Jongno-gu, Seoul. It uses replicas of historical objects to illustrate the history of traditional life of the Korean people.

History
The museum was established on 8 November 1945 by the U.S. Government and opened on 25 April 1946 at the City Administration Memorial Hall. When the museum was merged with National Museum of Korea, its collection of 4,555 artifacts was moved to the latter's Mt Namsan site. In 1975, when the National Museum moved onto the grounds of Gyeongbokgung Palace, it moved along with it into the Modern Art Museum Building. In 1993 it opened in its present site, which was the former site of the National Museum of Korea. The building's design is based on various historical buildings around South Korea.

Collection
The museum has over 98,000 artifacts and three main exhibition halls: "History of Korean People" features materials of everyday life in Korea from prehistoric times to the end of the Joseon Dynasty in 1910; "Korean Way of Life",  which illustrates Korean villagers in ancient times; and "Life Cycle of the Koreans", which depicts the deep roots of Confucianism in Korean culture and how this ideology gave rise to most of the culture's customs.

The museum also features open-air exhibits, such as replicas of spirit posts where villagers used to pray, stone piles for worship, grinding mills, rice storage shelters and pits for kimchi pots.

In March 2021, the National Folk Museum reopened an exhibition showcasing 20th century items from both the Joseon era as well as items from modern and contemporary Korea. The items are on display in Permanent Exhibition Hall 2, which reopened March 20th, 2021, after undergoing renovation.

See also
History of Korea
List of museums in Seoul
List of museums in South Korea

References

External links

Official website

Jongno District
Museums established in 1945
Folk museums in South Korea
Children's museums
Museums in Seoul
National museums of South Korea
Child-related organizations in South Korea